Slovenia participated in the Eurovision Song Contest 2022 in Turin, Italy, with the song "", written by Filip Vidušin, Žiga Žvižej, Gašper Hlupič, Mark Semeja, Zala Velenšek and Jakob Korošec and performed by LPS. The first stage  began on 29 November 2021 with the purpose of selecting four newcomer artists to advance to the second stage EMA 2022. The national final featured twenty entries competing across two semi-finals on 5 and 12 February 2022, and the final on 19 February 2022, where a combination of jury and public voting decided the Slovenian representative in Turin among twelve entries.

Slovenia was drawn to compete in the first semi-final of the Eurovision Song Contest which took place on 10 May 2022. Performing during the show in position 5, "" was not announced among the top 10 entries of the first semi-final and therefore did not qualify to compete in the final. It was later revealed that Slovenia placed last out of the 17 participating countries in the semi-final with just 15 points.

Background 

The country's only other top ten result was achieved in  when Tanja Ribič performing "" placed tenth. Since the introduction of semi-finals to the format of the contest in 2004, Slovenia had thus far only managed to qualify to the final on six occasions. In , Slovenia was represented by Ana Soklič with the song "Amen", which failed to qualify for the final, finishing in 13th place in the first semi-final with 44 points.

The Slovenian entry for the Eurovision Song Contest has traditionally been selected through a national final entitled  (EMA), which has been produced with variable formats.

Before Eurovision

EMA Freš 2022 

 returned as the first phase for Slovenia's selection for the Eurovision Song Contest for the second time after its first appearance in 2020, with a revamped format from the first edition. Newcomer artists who were not more than 30 years old and had released a maximum of three songs were eligible to apply for  via a submission period opened by RTVSLO on 8 October 2021. A total of 24 artists were selected to take part in the selection, which commenced on 29 November 2021. After a series of nights, each showcasing a duel, 14 entries advanced to take part in the televised final on 28 January 2022. The remaining fourteen entries competed for four places in EMA 2022, two selected by public voting and two selected by a jury.

Format 
Twenty-four songs competed in a series of duels starting in November 2021 for four weeks. After the duels, the fourteen winning songs competed in a televised live final selection show, which took place on 28 January 2022. The selection show saw the remaining fourteen songs compete for four places in the emerging category of EMA 2022.

After the four duels held each week (on Monday, Tuesday, Wednesday and Thursday), a weekly final was held on each Saturday where three out of the four weekly winners advanced: one selected via a public online vote and the other two by a committee composed of Joker Out singer Bojan Cvjetićanin, singer Eva Boto, who represented Slovenia in the Eurovision Song Contest 2012, and rapper Arne Međedović. Non-qualifiers were given a second chance on the following week (20 to 24 December), when one more act was chosen among three every day, for a total of fourteen finalists.

The full results were revealed after EMA 2022 on 20 February 2022.

The 14 remaining entries were then originally meant to compete in two final selection shows, in which two entries would qualify from each show. However, on 12 January 2022, it was revealed by RTVSLO that all 14 entries would compete in one show on 28 January 2022 due to programming issues and the effects of the COVID-19 pandemic in Slovenia at the time. The final saw four songs qualify for EMA 2022, with two songs chosen by the public and two by the jury.

Competing entries 

Artists and composers were able to submit their entries to the broadcaster between 8 October 2021 and 22 November 2021. All artists were required to be under the age of 30 and have three commercially released songs or fewer. Two days after the closing of the submission window, RTVSLO announced a total of 127 applications had been received for both competitions.

Contestant progress 
 2022 began with the first week of duels on 29 November 2021 and concluded with a live final on 28 January 2022.

Duels 

The first duel rounds took place between 29 November and 18 December 2021. All of the twenty-four competing entries were divided into three separate weeks. Each week featured four daily duels from Monday to Thursday with one qualifier from each duel progressing to the weekly final. The runners-up of each duel were given a second chance round after all of the other duels had taken place. The results were determined via an international online vote on RTVSLO's website from 8:00 (CET) to 19:00 (CET) on the day of each duel. Each week rounded up with an online webcast final that featured the four duel winners of the week. Three of the artists advanced to the final selection show, while the last place finisher advanced to the second chance round. The results of the weekly final were determined via a combination of both jury voting and internet voting. The jury panel that voted in the weekly finals consisted of the show presenters Bojan Cvjetićanin, who would go on to represent Slovenia in the Eurovision Song Contest 2023 as lead singer of Joker Out, Eva Boto, who represented Slovenia in the Eurovision Song Contest 2012 and Arne Međedović.

Second chance 

The remaining fifteen artists were given a second chance round between 20 and 24 December 2021. All fifteen performers were divided into five rounds, of which one from each would qualify for the final selection show. Similarly to the initial duel rounds, the results were determined by an international online vote held on RTVSLO's website.

Final 

The final of  took place on 28 January 2022 at 's Studio 1 in Ljubljana, and featured the fourteen remaining artists. The show saw four artists advance to EMA 2022, with two qualifiers determined by an expert jury panel, consisting of Maja Keuc, Maša Kljun and Matjaž Vlašič, and two by a public vote. The qualified entrants were Stela Sofia, Leya Leanne, LPS and LUMA. The show was hosted by TV presenter Melani Mekicar, singer Eva Boto, who represented Slovenia in the Eurovision Song Contest 2012, and rapper Arne Međedović. The exact running order for the show was revealed on 13 January 2022. Having only sung a small snippet of their songs live in the duel stage, between 14 January 2022 and 18 January 2022, RTVSLO released official studio cuts of the remaining fourteen entries via their social media platforms. In addition to the competing entries, co-presenters Arne Međedović performed his new single "Loverboy" and Eva Boto performed her new single "".

EMA 2022

EMA 2022 was the twenty-fourth edition of Slovenia's annual national final for the Eurovision Song Contest EMA. After RTVSLO internally selected Slovenia's entrant in 2021, the broadcaster confirmed the return of the selection process on 8 October 2022. All shows were hosted by Melani Mekicar and Bojan Cvjetićanin, with Nejc Šmit reporting live from the green room in the final. The competition was broadcast on TV SLO 1, Radio Val 202, Radio Koper, Radio Maribor and online via the broadcaster's RTV 4D platform.

Prior to the final on 19 February 2022, RTVSLO also broadcast a video analysis of all performances in a podcast hosted by Jaka Dolinšek, Eva Beus and Marko Crnković.

A live after-party and analysis of the results was also broadcast on TV SLO 2 with green room host Nejc Šmit following the final.

Format 
Upon announcing the return of EMA for 2022, RTVSLO revealed that, for the first time since 2017, the event would be held over three evenings. In each semi-final, eight established artists and two newcomer artists competed to advance to the final. Public voting selected three finalists and a jury selected another three. In the final, five five-member juries (50%) and public voting (50%) decided which of the 12 finalists would represent Slovenia in Turin.

Competing entries 

RTVSLO opened a submission period between 8 October 2021 and 22 November 2021 for artists and composers to submit their entries. All applicants were required to be at least sixteen years old on 1 February 2022, and the main performer (or at least half of the main performers in multi-performance ensembles) of the submitted composition must have permanent or temporary residence in the Republic of Slovenia. Two days after the closing of the submission window, RTVSLO announced a total of 127 applications had been received for both competitions. An expert jury panel consisting of Maja Keuc, Matjaž Vlašič, Žiga Pirnat, Maša Kljun and Žiga Klančar selected sixteen established acts to progress to EMA 2022. The first sixteen established competing acts were revealed on 19 December 2021, with the final newcomer four acts selected via  on 28 January 2022. Among the competing acts were BQL, who participated in both EMA 2017 and EMA 2018 and finished as runners-up respectively, and Slovene-British performer July Jones, who wrote "Kaos" for Raiven which finished second in EMA 2019. Among the competing songwriters were Maraaya, who won EMA 2015 and represented Slovenia in the Eurovision Song Contest 2015. Raay also wrote the EMA 2014 winning song and Slovenian Eurovision entry "Round and Round" for Tinkara Kovač and wrote the Slovenian Junior Eurovision entries in both 2014 and 2015.

Semi-finals 
The two semi-finals took place on 5 and 12 February 2022 at 20:20 (CET) and were broadcast on TV SLO 1. Each show featured ten performances, eight established artists and two newcomer artists, with six qualifying to the EMA 2022 final based on votes from a jury vote and public vote. The running order for the semi-finals was revealed on 19 January 2022, with 30 second snippets of all of the established competing performances revealed by RTVSLO from 20 to 21 January 2022. The songs were also promoted with further interviews and snippets on Radio Val 202 on 2 and 3 February 2022. Both semi-finals were opened with a Eurovision medley performance from co-host Bojan Cvjetićanin with "".

Final 
The final took place on 19 February 2022 at 20:20 (CET) and was broadcast on TV SLO 1, Radio Val 202, Radio Koper, Radio Maribor and via a live satellite broadcast on the broadcaster's website www.rtvslo.si. The show featured the twelve acts that qualified from the semi-finals. The combination of points from five thematical juries and a public vote selected LPS with "" to represent Slovenia in Turin. The juries consisted of members from OGAE Slovenia, songwriters, radio and television personalities and music performers. The running order for the final was revealed on 14 February 2022. In addition to the competing entries, co-host Bojan Cvjetićanin and  Amaya performed a cover of the winning entry of the Eurovision Song Contest 2021 for  "".

Ratings

Promotion 
LPS made several appearances across Europe and in Slovenia to specifically promote "" as the Slovenian Eurovision entry. The band first performed at the Eurovision in Concert at Amsterdam's AFAS Live on 9 April, which was hosted by Edsilia Rombley and Cornald Maas. Having made several appearances across Slovenian television, the band travelled to Zagreb, Croatia where they appeared on the  show alongside the  Konstrakta on 16 April 2022.

On 11 April 2022, an accompanying music video was released by the band and was uploaded to the Eurovision YouTube channel. On 9 May 2022, the day before the first semi-final, the band released an English language version of the song.

At Eurovision 

According to Eurovision rules, all nations with the exceptions of the host country and the "Big Five" (France, Germany, Italy, Spain and the United Kingdom) are required to qualify from one of two semi-finals in order to compete for the final; the top ten countries from each semi-final progress to the final. The European Broadcasting Union (EBU) split up the competing countries into six different pots based on voting patterns from previous contests, with countries with favourable voting histories put into the same pot. On 25 January 2022, an allocation draw was held which placed each country into one of the two semi-finals, as well as which half of the show they would perform in. Slovenia was placed into the first semi-final, which was held on 10 May 2022, and was scheduled to perform in the first half of the show.

Once all the competing songs for the 2022 contest had been released, the running order for the semi-finals was decided by the shows' producers rather than through another draw, so that similar songs were not placed next to each other.

The Slovene spokesperson, who announced the top 12-point score awarded by the Slovenian jury during the final, was Lorella Flego, who previously announced the points for Slovenia in both 2012 and 2021.

Semi-final

LPS took part in technical rehearsals on 30 April and 4 May, followed by dress rehearsals on 9 and 10 May. This included the jury show on 9 May where the professional juries of each country watched and voted on the competing entries.

The Slovenian performance featured LPS scattered across the stage encircling a giant disco ball, with drummer Gašper Hlupič positioned above the disco ball on a tall black drum kit. The band members were dressed in 1960s inspired suits with burgundy being the predominant colour theme of the performance. The camera work was carried out in a way that rotated around the disco ball and band members for the entirety of the Slovenian show.

At the end of the show, Slovenia was not announced among the top 10 entries in the first semi-final and therefore failed to qualify to compete in the final. This was the second consecutive absence of Slovenia from the final, having last appeared in 2019. It was later revealed that Slovenia placed seventeenth (last) in the semi-final, receiving a total of just 15 points: 8 points from the televoting and 7 points from the juries. This marked Slovenia's worst Eurovision performance since 2013 and the second time the nation finished in last place in the semi-final.

Voting 

Below is a breakdown of points awarded to Slovenia during the first semi-final. Voting during the three shows involved each country awarding two sets of points from 1-8, 10 and 12: one from their professional jury and the other from televoting. The exact composition of the professional jury, and the results of each country's jury and televoting were released after the final; the individual results from each jury member were also released in an anonymised form. In the first semi-final, Slovenia finished in seventeenth place out of seventeen entries, marking Slovenia's first last place finish in a Eurovision semi-final since 2013 attaining only 15 points.

Points awarded to Slovenia

Points awarded by Slovenia

Detailed voting results
The following members comprised the Slovene jury: 
 Alenka Godec – singer
  – rapper, TV host, co-presenter of Slovenia's national selection
 Gaber Radojevič – music producer, composer, audio engineer
 Lucija Harum – singer-songwriter, producer, participated in Slovenia's 2022 Eurovision selection as a part of Luma
  – cellist, TV presenter

References 

2022
Countries in the Eurovision Song Contest 2022
Eurovision